Robert Lee, 4th Earl of Lichfield (1706–1776) was an English politician and peer, the last of the Earls of Lichfield.

Birth and origins 
Robert was born on 3 July 1706 in St. James Street, Westminster, London. He was one of the ten children and the youngest of the sons of Edward Henry Lee and his wife Charlotte FitzRoy. His father was created the 1st Earl of Lichfield just before his marriage. Robert's mother was a natural daughter of Charles II and Barbara Villiers.

Early life 
Lee was MP for Oxford from 1754 to 1768, and considered a Tory. Lee held the sinecure position of Custos Brevium of the Court of Common Pleas, in the royal gift.

Marriage 
On 29 May 1745, at St Paul's Cathedral, London, Lee married Catherine Stonhouse (1708–1784), daughter of Sir John Stonhouse, 3rd Baronet, of Radley, Berkshire. The marriage was childless.

4th Earl 
On 17 September 1772, at the age of 66, Lee became the 4th Earl of Lichfield when the 3rd Earl, his nephew, died childless.

Death, succession, and timeline 
Lord Lichfield, as he now was, died childless on 4 November 1776, falling off his horse while hunting near Ditchley. He was buried in the All Saints church in Spelsbury in an elaborate marble monument by William Tyler (architect). He was the last Earl of this, the second, creation of the title. The earldom became extinct, but the estate went to his niece Lady Charlotte Lee, eldest surviving daughter of his brother, George Lee, 2nd Earl of Lichfield. In 1744 Charlotte had married Viscount Dillon. Their son Charles Dillon, 12th Viscount Dillon inherited the estate at his mother's death in 1794. This included the house at Ditchley, which remained the home of the Viscounts Dillon until 1934.

Notes and references

Notes

Citations

Sources 
 
 
 
 
  – L to M (for Lichfield)
  – (for timeline)

1706 births
1776 deaths
British MPs 1754–1761
British MPs 1761–1768
4th Earl of Lichfield
Members of the Parliament of Great Britain for English constituencies